The 1995 All-Ireland Senior Hurling Championship Final (sponsored by Guinness) was the 108th All-Ireland Final and the culmination of the 1995 All-Ireland Senior Hurling Championship, an inter-county hurling tournament for the top teams in Ireland. The match was held at Croke Park, Dublin, on 3 September 1995, between Clare and Offaly. The Leinster champions lost to their Munster opponents on a score line of 1-13 to 2-8.  It was Clare's first All-Ireland title since 1914.
The match was shown live in Ireland on Network 2 with match commentary by Ger Canning with analysis by Tomás Mulcahy.

Match details

Summary
Offaly's  Daithí Regan opened the scoring in the game with a long range point into the canal end of the stadium. Billy Dooley then got a second point for Offaly after a high ball broke to him on the right. Seánie McMahon got Clare's opening score with a long range point to make the score 0-2 to 0-1 in Offaly's favor. Ollie Baker scored from a side line ball on the right to put Clare ahead by a point. Johnny Pilkington got a goal in the second half when he pulled on a loose ball in front of goals that went low and rolled into the net past Clare goalkeeper Davy Fitzgerald. Clare's goal in the second half came when a long range free from Anthony Daly was patted back into play by Offaly goalkeeper David Hughes where it was hit high to the net from the edge of the square by Éamonn Taaffe.

Aftermath
Clare captain Anthony Daly received the Liam MacCarthy Cup from GAA President Jack Boothman in the Hogan Stand and gave a famous speech saying "'There's been a missing person in Clare for 81 long years. Well today that person has been found alive and that person's name is Liam McCarthy".

The Sunday Game (which was broadcast that night) crossed over to the winners hotel in Dublin, with Ger Canning and Marty Morrissey interviewing the winning manager Ger Loughnane and some of the players.

References

External links
Match Highlights
Match Programme Cover

All-Ireland Senior Hurling Championship Final
All-Ireland Senior Hurling Championship Final, 1995
All-Ireland Senior Hurling Championship Final
All-Ireland Senior Hurling Championship Finals
Clare county hurling team matches
Offaly county hurling team matches